Alfonso Carbajo (born 17 February 1938) is a Spanish boxer. He competed in the men's bantamweight event at the 1960 Summer Olympics.

References

1938 births
Living people
Spanish male boxers
Olympic boxers of Spain
Boxers at the 1960 Summer Olympics
Boxers from Barcelona
Mediterranean Games medalists in boxing
Bantamweight boxers
Mediterranean Games silver medalists for Spain
Competitors at the 1959 Mediterranean Games